Attaque Team Gusto was a Taiwanese UCI Continental cycling team established in 2014. The team folded after the 2017 season, and the sponsor and some team members merged to Team Ljubljana Gusto Xaurum.

Final roster (2017)

Major wins
2014
Stage 3 Tour of Thailand, Feng Chun-kai
 National Road Race championships, Feng Chun-kai
2015
Stage 1 Tour de Filipinas, Eric Sheppard
Stage 4 Tour of Thailand, Ronald Yeung
Stage 3 Tour de Kumano, Thomas Rabou
Stage 4 Tour de Singkarak, Thomas Rabou
2016
GP Capodarco, Jai Hindley
Overall Tour of Thailand, Benjamin Hill
Stage 4 Tour de Filipinas, Timothy Guy
Stage 3 Tour of Taihu Lake, Cameron Bayly
2017
Overall Tour de Tochigi, Benjamin Hill
Points classification, Benjamin Hill
Mountains classification, Benjamin Hill
Prologue Tour de Kumano, Szymon Sajnok

National champions
2014
 Taiwan Road Race, Feng Chun-kai

References

UCI Continental Teams (Europe)
Cycling teams established in 2014
Cycling teams disestablished in 2018
Cycling teams based in Slovenia
2014 establishments in Taiwan